Helmut Gertel (born 27 April 1961) is a German boxer. He competed in the men's light welterweight event at the 1984 Summer Olympics. At the 1984 Summer Olympics, he lost to Jerry Page of the United States.

References

External links
 

1961 births
Living people
German male boxers
Olympic boxers of West Germany
Boxers at the 1984 Summer Olympics
People from Worms, Germany
Light-welterweight boxers
Sportspeople from Rhineland-Palatinate